Fenticlor (also spelled fentichlor) is an antibacterial and antifungal agent for topical use.  It is an antimicrobial agent. It is also used in veterinary medicine.


Synthesis
It is prepared by the AlCl3-catalyzed reaction of 4-chlorophenol with sulfur dichloride. It can also be prepared by chlorination of bis[2-hydroxyphenyl]sulfide.

Safety
LD50 (rats, oral) = 3250 mg/kg.  It may cause photosensitivity

References 
 

Antifungals
Antiseptics
Phenols
Thioethers
Chloroarenes